Hesycha biguttata is a species of beetle in the family Cerambycidae, known from Bolivia. It was described by Martins and Galileo in 2010.

References

 Onciderini
Beetles described in 2010